World Cup Korea may refer to:

 the 2002 FIFA World Cup of Korea and Japan.
 the 2007 FIFA U-17 World Cup of Korea Republic.
 the 2017 FIFA U-20 World Cup of Korea Republic.